The 1973 Virginia Slims of Indianapolis  was a women's tennis tournament played on indoor hardcourts at the Convention-Expo Center in Indianapolis, Indiana in the United States that was part of the 1973 Virginia Slims Circuit. It was the second edition of the tournament and was held from February 22 through February 26, 1973. Third-seeded Billie Jean King won the singles title and earned $6,000 first-prize money. In the semifinal King, coming back from a three months break, saved three match points against Margaret Court and ended Court's 12-tournament 54-match winning streak.

Finals

Singles
 Billie Jean King defeated  Rosemary Casals 5–7, 6–2, 6–4

Doubles
 Rosemary Casals /  Billie Jean King defeated  Margaret Court /  Lesley Hunt 7–5, 6–4

Prize money

References

Virginia Slims of Indianapolis
Virginia Slims of Indianapolis
Virginia Slims of Indianapolis
Virginia Slims of Indianapolis
Virginia Slims of Indianapolis